Parallel Economic Model (PEM) is a theoretical dual economy model meant for use used within a State or Province of a larger nation-state.

Description
Most western countries use a singular Linear-Economic (LEM) model for all Commerce.  This includes Banking and Trade based transactions.

Under a PEM based system there is also a Secondary State-Provincial (SSP) sanctioned secondary currency and sub-economy that is meant only to allow basic Commerce to occur within that State or Province.   The State currency used in this case is not traded on international FX currency markets,  so as not to compete with the National Currency.   The goal of keeping that currency localized is also to help foster local economies. Particularly those that have been effected (or at risk of being effected) by any National Currency crisis situation.   Be that hyper-inflation, debt,  systematic banking collapse,  or devaluation of the national currency, etc.

The Secondary State-Provincial level currency is also not Fiat based (which most now are).  Nor is the SSP currency pegged to any other foreign or domestic currency, as many are to the US dollar.  Instead the localized currency is backed by some form of Fixed Asset or Precious Metals standard.   Meaning there cannot be more currency printed then the State/Province has assets to back the currency up properly.   At the very least with a 50% or more Reserves rule in place.

The origin of this Economic model came from work done by Emergency-Disaster Planner and student of Economics, Stephen Chafe.

PEM was formulated to deal with how to deploy working Commerce system systems during any longer duration Regional Disaster,  where electronic and digital system would likely be unreliable or not available due to regular Banking or Financial closures.   PEM was also meant as means to go into a Disaster zone or region where Currency Collapse had happened due to Hyper-inflation or closure of all normal Commerce systems,  and have a pre-printed currency that could be used for basic labour and goods purchases.   Similar to the system used in Argentina by the local Governors when that nation state had a Currency crisis in the 1990’s.

PEM is also a means to strength a localized economy,  where that economy is a slave to cheaper imports from international providers.   Having two separate currency systems allows local merchants and artisans to sell their goods at local Street Markets or Farmers Markets,  and use the proceeds to trade goods for needed locally grow food.  Meaning it also works well to be protectionist of local economic manufacturers or producers,  but still work in tandem with any existing National currency system.   This means that PEM based economies could displace the use of what are called “Alternative Currencies” which,  but be backed by the State-Provincial government in order to give any paper notes legitimacy for wider use.

This system of separating Currencies is also meant to be a precursor to a form of UBI (Universal Basic Income) at the regional level,  where it best deployed.  Because the currency is localized, it can also act as a stop gap measure against sudden National Currency devaluations or spikes in Inflation pressures.   If tied to a regional Productivity Index or used by an appointed Currency Board (such as was done in Bulgaria during their economic collapse)  then it provides a means to allow external investment into that Nation-State,  without causing a run on local pricing models for essential goods or services.

Because PEM requires that the State-Province maintains a secure supply of Gold/Silver/Asset, which is used to back the Secondary Currency,   it means that the State also has additional options to be able to use that Precious Metal supply (or part of it) as a form of Collateral guarantee to obtain loans from the IMF or other International investment.  Especially true when that State-Provinces credit ratings may preclude them being able to borrow based on the ability of the National Economy to pay any loan back.  This works as a double layer of economic security for the local government.

In this current day and age of moving towards Globalized Currencies,  there is a need to maintain local Currencies and Banking options.  In such an event,  local government officials would also have a secondary system to fall back on.   That is why PEM as a working model is an effective Plan-B for governments with limited financial resources to deal with certain forms of Economic Crisis, Disaster, or severe Recessionary downturn situations that create widespread Poverty.

References

Economics models